Nanoscale is the length scale applicable to nanotechnology, usually cited as 1–100 nanometers.

Nanoscale or NanoScale may also refer to:
NanoScale Corporation, an American nanotechnology company
Nanoscale (journal) published by the Royal Society of Chemistry
Nanoscale Research Letters, a journal published by Springer